Jacob Ralph Kupp (born March 12, 1941) is a former American football guard in the National Football League for the Dallas Cowboys, Washington Redskins, Atlanta Falcons and New Orleans Saints. He played college football at the University of Washington.

Early years
Kupp attended Sunnyside High School, where he practiced football, basketball and baseball. He began playing football on the varsity team until his senior season.

He accepted a football scholarship from the University of Washington, where he played offensive tackle, offensive end and defensive end. He became a starter until his senior season, posting on offense 6	receptions for 126 yards and 2 touchdowns.

He was a part of two Rose Bowl teams and was also a pitcher for the baseball team.

Professional career

Dallas Cowboys
Kupp was selected by the Dallas Cowboys in the ninth round (116th overall) of the 1964 NFL Draft as a tight end. He was converted into an offensive guard during training camp, where he made the NFL All-Rookie team after starting 10 games at left guard. The next year he started all 14 games at left guard.

On August 30, 1966, he was traded to the Washington Redskins at the end of the 1965 season, along with Brig Owens and Mitch Johnson, in exchange for Jim Steffen and a fifth round draft choice (#119-Willie Parker).

Washington Redskins
In 1966, because the coaching staff considered that Kupp lacked the necessary size for the offensive line, the Washington Redskins tried to play him at tight end. He appeared in 14 games, making 4 receptions for 28 yards, as a backup behind Jerry Smith. He was left unprotected for the 
1967 NFL Expansion Draft.

New Orleans Saints (first stint)
Kupp became one of the original members of the New Orleans Saints, after being selected in the 1967 NFL Expansion Draft, playing 5 regular season games as a starter at left guard, before being released.

Atlanta Falcons
On November 5, 1967, the Atlanta Falcons claimed him off waivers and would appear in 6 games with 5 starts at left guard.

New Orleans Saints (second stint)
Although the rights to his contract were traded to the Atlanta Falcons, it was only one year, instead of his full 2-year contract, forcing his return in 1968 to the New Orleans Saints, based on a league ruling that long term contract players can be waived one season only (rule since rescinded). He made the Pro Bowl as an offensive guard in 1969. He was named one of the team's offensive captains in 1969.

He originally retired at the end of the 1973 season, but changed his mind and reported to training camp the following year. Although he never experienced a winning season with the franchise, he was inducted into the New Orleans Saints Hall of Fame, while also being named to the franchise's 25th, 40th and 50th Anniversary teams.

Personal life
Kupp currently resides in Yakima, Washington. His son Craig Kupp played for the Phoenix Cardinals. His grandsons Cooper Kupp and Ketner Kupp currently play for the Los Angeles Rams. His family is one of only five in NFL history to have three generations selected in the NFL draft.

He appeared in the film Number One.

References

External links
Jake Kupp Tells Students To Dream 

1941 births
Living people
People from Sunnyside, Washington
Players of American football from Washington (state)
American football offensive linemen
Washington Huskies baseball players
Washington Huskies football players
Dallas Cowboys players
Washington Redskins players
Atlanta Falcons players
New Orleans Saints players
Eastern Conference Pro Bowl players
American people of Swiss descent